King of Pro-Wrestling is an annual professional wrestling event promoted by New Japan Pro-Wrestling (NJPW). The event has been held every October since 2012 and aired domestically as a pay-per-view (PPV). The event also aired internationally as an internet pay-per-view (iPPV) until 2015, when it was moved to NJPW's worldwide internet streaming site, NJPW World.

King of Pro-Wrestling was created by Bushiroad, a card game company, which had bought NJPW in January 2012. The event became NJPW's main show of October, a spot previously held by Destruction, which was instead moved back to September. Held annually at Tokyo's Ryōgoku Kokugikan, the event has been nicknamed  and is considered NJPW's biggest event between August's G1 Climax and the January 4 Tokyo Dome Show. Traditionally, King of Pro-Wrestling is main evented by the final defense of the IWGP Heavyweight Championship before the January 4 Tokyo Dome Show.

King of Pro-Wrestling is also the name of a collectible card game, created by Bushiroad.

Events

See also

List of New Japan Pro-Wrestling pay-per-view events

References

External links
The official New Japan Pro-Wrestling website
King of Pro-Wrestling at ProWrestlingHistory.com